The Quzhou–Ningde railway is a single-track electrified railway in China. The journey time is 5 hours and 27 minutes.

History
Construction on a single-track railway began in 2015. The line began operation on 27 September 2020.

Stations
The line has the following passenger stations:
Quzhou
Longyou South
Suichang
Songyang
Longquan City
Qingyuan
Songxi
Zhenghe
Jian'ou East
Pingnan
Zhouning
Zhitishan
Ningde

References

Railway lines in China
Railway lines opened in 2020